Jared Nightingale (born October 3, 1982) is an American former professional ice hockey defenseman who primarily played in the American Hockey League (AHL).

Playing career
On January 30, 2009, Nightingale signed an AHL contract with the Hartford Wolf Pack. He was re-signed by Hartford on August 23, 2010. After five seasons with the affiliates of the New York Rangers organization, Nightingale was signed to an AHL contract with the Syracuse Crunch on July 5, 2012.

On July 22, 2013, Nightingale continued his journeyman career by signing a one-year contract with the Rockford IceHogs, an AHL affiliate of the Chicago Blackhawks.

On February 5, 2015, the Grand Rapids Griffins signed Nightingale to a professional try out. Nightingale recorded one assist in six games with the Hartford Wolf Pack, and one assist in 20 games with the Norfolk Admirals. Most recently he spent 13 games with the Toledo Walleye of the ECHL, where he recorded three points. On February 9, 2015, Nightingale was released from his professional try out, and returned to the Norfolk Admirals.

On August 26, 2015, the Toledo Walleye re-signed Nightingale to a one-year contract.

Following the conclusion of the 2016–17 season with the Chicago Wolves, and having appeared in 472 regular season AHL games, Nightingale announced his retirement from professional hockey on August 31, 2017.

In the 2017–18 season, Nightingale briefly came out of retirement, playing a solitary game with the Quad City Mallards of the ECHL on January 21, 2018, before returning to his assistant coaching role with the Omaha Lancers of the United States Hockey League.

Personal life
Nightingale's older brother, Adam, is the head coach for the Michigan State Spartans men's ice hockey team, while his other brother, Jason, is Assistant Director of Amateur Scouting for the Buffalo Sabres.

Career statistics

References

External links

1982 births
American men's ice hockey defensemen
Charlotte Checkers (1993–2010) players
Chicago Wolves players
Connecticut Whale (AHL) players
Grand Rapids Griffins players
Hartford Wolf Pack players
Ice hockey players from Michigan
Idaho Steelheads (ECHL) players
Iowa Stars players
Living people
Milwaukee Admirals players
Norfolk Admirals players
Sportspeople from Jackson, Michigan
Quad City Mallards (ECHL) players
Rockford IceHogs (AHL) players
Springfield Falcons players
Syracuse Crunch players
Toledo Walleye players